The Wittlich Synagogue was a synagogue built in 1909– in Wittlich, Germany. The restored building still stands and is located on Himmeroder Straße 44.

History 
The Jewish community in Wittlich had previously used a smaller synagogue at Himmeroder Straße 8 that fell into disrepair. Subsequently, the current synagogue was erected on the same street according to the designs of architect Johannes Vieknen.
The synagogue was consecrated in November 1910 by chief rabbi Jakob Baßfreund of Trier.

Under Nazi rule 
During Kristallnacht in November 1938, the interior of the synagogue was destroyed by the Sturmabteilung and others. The city of Wittlich bought the building the following year and used it as a prisoner of war camp throughout World War II. Around 250 Jews were forced out of Wittlich, with the last deportation taking place in 1942. Ultimately, a third of the Jewish community of Wittlich was murdered in Nazi concentration camps. None of the survivors returned to Wittlich after the war, rendering the synagogue without a congregation.

Architecture 
The exterior of the synagogue remains largely unchanged from 1910. The interior comprised a prayer hall for men, a slim torah ark facing toward the east, and galleries for women on three sides. Typically for the period, the decor combined elements of German art nouveau with touches of neo-romanticism, as with the painted ornamentation surrounding the ark and the sanctuary lamp. This ornamentation was later restored from surviving drawings and the faded remains. The former torah ark was resurrected as a memorial in front of the building.

Memorial 
A commemorative plaque in the former torah ark contains inscriptions in Hebrew:

and German:

Present day 
After 1975, the city of Wittlich restored the former synagogue. Today the building functions as a cultural and conference center with a permanent exhibition on Jewish life in Wittlich.

References 
 „… und dies ist die Pforte des Himmels“. Synagogen Rheinland-Pfalz und Saarland. Bearbeitet von Stefan Fischbach u. a., hrsg. vom Landesamt für Denkmalpflege Rheinland-Pfalz u. a., Mainz 2005, S. 390–395 (Gedenkbuch der Synagogen in Deutschland, Bd. 2),

External links 

 Wittlich Synagogue from Alemannia Judaica
 Information on the Synagogue on the Website of the Kulturamts Wittlich
Jewish Community of Wittlich

Buildings and structures in Bernkastel-Wittlich
Former synagogues in Germany